TNR may refer to:

 TNR, the gene that encodes the protein Tenascin-R
 Ivato International Airport, Antananarivo, Madagascar, IATA code
 The New Republic, an American magazine of politics and the arts
 Times New Roman, a popular typeface installed on most desktop computers
 Train Navette Rapide, an express train service in Morocco
 Trap-neuter-return, a method for managing feral cats
 T.N.Rajarathnam Pillai (1898-1956), Indian musician